The Gera is a river in Thuringia, Germany.

The Gera is a right tributary of the Unstrut. It originates in the Thuringian Forest, west of Ilmenau. The Gera is formed in Plaue, by the confluence of the Wilde Gera and the Zahme Gera. It empties into the Unstrut in Straußfurt. The largest towns along the Gera are Arnstadt and Erfurt. The city Gera is not situated along the River Gera.

Along its way, Gera River splits up and reunites multiple times. Branches of the Gera are:
 Converging Tributaries: Wilde Gera, Zahme Gera
 Erfurt Area: Flutgraben (constructed after 1873 in order to protect Erfurt from flooding, this was successful), Bergstrom, Breitstrom, Zahme Gera
 Between Erfurt and the Unstrut: Gera, Schmale Gera, Mahlgera

The original name of Gera River was Erphes River (Latin for brown, muddy water), which survived in the name of Erfurt coming from “ford at Erphes River”.

See also
List of rivers of Thuringia

Rivers of Thuringia
 
Rivers of Germany